HD 156411 is a 7th magnitude G-type main-sequence star located approximately 186 light years away in the southern constellation Ara. This star is larger, hotter, brighter, and more massive than the Sun. Its metal content is three-fourths as much as the Sun. The star is around 4.3 billion years old and is spinning with a projected rotational velocity of 1.8 km/s. Naef and associates (2010) noted the star appears to be slightly evolved, and thus may be in the process of leaving the main sequence. In 2009, a gas giant planet was found in orbit around the star.

The star HD 156411 is named Inquill. The name was selected in the NameExoWorlds campaign by Peru, during the 100th anniversary of the IAU. Inquil was one half of the couple involved in the tragic love story Way to the Sun by Abraham Valdelomar.

See also 
 List of extrasolar planets

References 

G-type main-sequence stars
Planetary systems with one confirmed planet
Ara (constellation)
Durchmusterung objects
156411
084787